Enrique U. Sabari Gaytén (born May 25, 1965 in Camagüey) is a 
retired male weightlifter from Cuba. He competed for Cuba at the 1996 Summer Olympics, finishing in 12th place in the overall rankings of the men's middle-heavyweight division (– 91 kg). The other Cuban competitor in the same weight class was Carlos Alexis Hernández, who finished in sixth place.

References
 sports-reference

1965 births
Living people
Cuban male weightlifters
Weightlifters at the 1996 Summer Olympics
Olympic weightlifters of Cuba
Sportspeople from Camagüey
Pan American Games medalists in weightlifting
Pan American Games gold medalists for Cuba
Central American and Caribbean Games medalists in weightlifting
Weightlifters at the 1983 Pan American Games
20th-century Cuban people
21st-century Cuban people